Petja Piiroinen (born 15 August 1991) is a snowboarder from Finland. He won the gold medal at the 2011 FIS Snowboarding World Championships in the big air event. He is the younger brother of fellow snowboarder Peetu Piiroinen.

References

External links
 FIS-Ski.com - Biography

1991 births
Living people
Finnish male snowboarders